Saint-Julien-lès-Russey (literally Saint-Julien near Russey) is a commune in the Doubs département in the Bourgogne-Franche-Comté region in eastern France.

Geography

Population

See also
 Le Russey
 Communes of the Doubs department

References

External links

 Saint-Julien-lès-Russey on the regional Web site 

Communes of Doubs